Limognitherium is an extinct genus of chalicothere.

Sources
 Classification of Mammals by Malcolm C. McKenna and Susan K. Bell

Chalicotheres